Andreas (Andrei) Eremeevich Arzruni ( 27 November (9 December) 1847 in Moscow; - 10 (22) September 1898 in Hohenhonof, Germany) was an Armenian-Russian mineralogist and geologist. He was Grigor Artsruni's brother.

Works

References

1847 births
1898 deaths
Academic staff of RWTH Aachen University
Armenian geologists
Scientists from Moscow
Armenian people from the Russian Empire